The Ghana Medical and Dental Council is an agency of the Ghana government responsible for regulating the standards of training and practice of medicine and dentistry in Ghana. It is located in Accra the capital city of Ghana.

See also
Ghana Medical Association
University of Ghana Medical School
Ministry of Health

References

External links
 Homepage for Medical and Dental Council

Government of Ghana
Medical and health organisations based in Ghana
Medical and health regulators
Regulation in Ghana